The 1976 Iowa State Cyclones football team represented Iowa State University in the Big Eight Conference during the 1976 NCAA Division I football season. In their fourth year under head coach Earle Bruce, the Cyclones compiled an 8–3 record (4–3 against conference opponents), tied for fourth place in the conference, and outscored opponents by a combined total of 369 to 216. They played their home games at Cyclone Stadium (now known as Jack Trice Stadium) in Ames, Iowa.

Dave Greenwood, Tony Hawkins, Wayne Stanley, and Maynard Stensrud were the team captains.

Schedule

Roster

Game summaries

at Missouri

Nebraska

References

Iowa State
Iowa State Cyclones football seasons
Iowa State Cyclones football